Cura or CURA may refer to:

Music 
 Cura (album), 2018 Keys N Krates release
 Cura (instrument), Turkish musical instrument

Organizations 
 Center for Urban and Regional Analysis (CURA), Ohio State University
 Institute on Culture, Religion, and World Affairs (CURA), founded by Peter L. Berger at Boston University

People 
 Cura (surname), a surname of Latin origin
 Cura Ocllo (died 1539), Inca queen

Other uses 
 Cura (flatworm), genus of flatworms in the family Dugesiidae
 Cura (mythology), ancient Roman divinity whose name means "Care" or "Concern"
 Cura (software), Open source 3D print preparation software developed by Ultimaker
 Cura River, Venezuela

See also
 
 Cure (disambiguation)
 La Cura (disambiguation)
 Villa de Cura, town in Venezuela
 Quanta cura, 1864 papal encyclical
 Cura Mori District
 Cura nagara, a folk drum